Nils Robert af Ursin (18 April 1854, Kuopio – 8 May 1936, Hämeenlinna) was a Finnish secondary school teacher and politician. He was a member of the Diet of Finland from 1891 to 1900 and again from 1904 to 1905 and of the Parliament of Finland from 1907 to 1908.

Af Ursin was at first active in the Young Finnish Party, but his views evolved gradually from liberalism to socialism and in 1899 he was among the founders of the Finnish Labour Party (which changed its name to Social Democratic Party of Finland in 1903) and served as the first chairman of the party from 1899 to 1900. During the Finnish Civil War in 1918, he sided with the Reds and when the Red side lost the war, he went into exile in Soviet Russia. When the Communist Party of Finland (SKP) was founded on 29 August 1918 in Moscow by most of the exiled leaders of Red Finland, af Ursin did not join it. He left Soviet Russia for Sweden in 1920 and returned to Finland in 1922.

References

1854 births
1936 deaths
People from Kuopio
People from Kuopio Province (Grand Duchy of Finland)
Young Finnish Party politicians
Leaders of the Social Democratic Party of Finland
Members of the Diet of Finland
Members of the Parliament of Finland (1907–08)
People of the Finnish Civil War (Red side)
University of Helsinki alumni
Finnish emigrants to Russia
Finnish emigrants to Sweden
Finnish refugees
Refugees in Russia